Dyspessa arabeska is a species of moth of the family Cossidae. It is found in Turkey.

The length of the forewings is 8–10 mm in males. The forewings are light yellow and the hindwings are grey.

References

Moths described in 2005
Dyspessa
Moths of Asia